The Canton of St. Gallen until 2002 was divided into 14 districts. On 1 January 2003 they were abolished and the canton was divided into 8 constituencies.

There are (as of 2016) 77 municipalities in the canton.

Constituencies since 2003 

The canton abolished the district level in 2003, but it remains divided into eight constituencies (Wahlkreise) without administrative significance:

Districts to 2002 

 Alttoggenburg
 Gaster
 Gossau
 Neutoggenburg
 Oberrheintal
 Obertoggenburg
 Rorschach
 St. Gallen
 Sargans
 See
 Unterrheintal
 Untertoggenburg
 Werdenberg
 Wil

See also 
 :de:Ehemalige Bezirke des Kantons St. Gallen